The Linux Link Tech Show is one of the longest running Linux podcasts in the world. Episode 500 aired on April 10, 2013.

Distribution
The Linux Link Tech Show is broadcast live on the internet every Wednesday at 8:30 P.M. Eastern Standard Time. Podcasts are made available shortly after under a Creative Commons license.

History
It was originally started by Lehigh Valley Linux User Group members Dann Washko and Linc Fessenden in September 2003. Allan Metzler, "the guy that brought the equipment", soon joined the show as a regular host in October of that year. In early 2005 Patrick Davila (who was a member of the same LUG as Dann and Linc) joined the show as a permanent host completing the current Tech Show lineup. Initially their goal was to simply provide "a weekly *live* webcast radio-style show about Linux and Technology", but they have since expanded out into podcasting. In fact, they were one of the very early adopters, and their very own Linc Fessenden wrote BashPodder, being unhappy with the current state of Linux podcast clients at the time.

In March 2009 it was announced several new guest hosts would be joining the show on a weekly rotating basis. The initial guest hosts include Chess Griffin, Dave Yates, Chad Wollenberg, Joel "Gorkon" Mclaughlin and Justin "threethirty" O'Brien.

The 365th show was recorded/broadcast on Wednesday the 4th of August 2010, when the hosts decided it was time to throw in the towel on their "1st season". The "2nd season" kicked off the weekend of September 11, 2010 during Ohio Linux Fest.

2014 Roster of Regular LocalHosts includes: Dann Washko, Dan "The Man" Frey, Pat Davila, Joel "Gorkon" McLaughlin, Rich "FlyingRich" Hughes, and T.J. "Pegwole" Werhley.

The hosts provide an entertaining viewpoint and have joked about being The Original Cockroaches of Podcasting. Their 13th anniversary broadcast of show 675 occurred on Wednesday September 21, 2016.

Guests 

The Linux Link Tech Show have had a number of key figures (from 15 different countries) from the free and open source software community as guests. Guests have included Richard Stallman, Chris DiBona, Bruce Perens, Ian Murdock, Patrick Volkerding, Mark Shuttleworth, Nat Friedman, Ted Ts'o and Miguel de Icaza.

Further reading 
 OpenMoko Project Press Coverage Page
 Software Freedom Law Center
 KDE.org website

References

External links
 
 HPR Community members remember the digital dragon
 Interview of KDE Developer Aaron Seigo- Episode 101 in MP3 and OGG

Technology podcasts